The 2014 UK Music Video Awards were held on 10 November 2014 at the Queen Elizabeth Hall in Southbank Centre, London and was hosted by Adam Buxton to recognise the best in music videos and music film making from United Kingdom and worldwide. The nominations were announced on 2 October 2014. The collaboration "Turn Down for What" between French producer DJ Snake and American rapper Lil Jon received the award for Video of the Year, directed by filmmaking duo Daniels. Korea-American director Joseph Kahn received the Icon Award.

Video of the Year

Icon Award

Video Genre Categories

Technical Achievement Categories

Non-traditional Music Visual and Public Vote Categories

Individual Categories

References

External links
Official website

UK Music Video Awards
UK Music Video Awards
UK Music Video Awards